Alanganallur revenue block in the Madurai district of Tamil Nadu, India. It has a total of 37 panchayat villages. It has the same name and boundaries as the revenue block.

Panchayat villages
The thirty-seven panchayat villages in Alanganallur are:

References 

Revenue blocks of Madurai district